Zigaza (Yegäźe) is a rural locality (a selo) and the administrative centre of Zigazinsky Selsoviet, Beloretsky District, Bashkortostan, Russia. The population was 638 as of 2010. There are 10 streets.

Geography 
Zigaza is located 91 km west of Beloretsk (the district's administrative centre) by road. Butayevo is the nearest rural locality.

References 

Rural localities in Beloretsky District